Hannah, Queen of the Vampires (original title La tumba de la isla maldita') (a.k.a. Young Hanna, Queen Of The Vampires and Crypt of the Living Dead and Vampire Woman) is a 1973 Spanish/American horror film directed by Julio Salvador with additional footage directed by Ray Danton and starring Andrew Prine, Teresa Gimpera, Mark Damon and Patty Shepard.

Plot
A vampire, (Teresa Gimpera), entombed on a remote island is accidentally awakened and begins to terrorize the island's inhabitants.

Cast

Home media
The film was released on DVD by VCI in June 2001.

References

External links
 
 

1973 films
1973 horror films
American multilingual films
Spanish multilingual films
American supernatural horror films
Films shot in Istanbul
1970s Spanish-language films
1970s English-language films
English-language Spanish films
Spanish supernatural horror films
American vampire films
1973 multilingual films
1970s American films
1970s Spanish films